TMS may refer to:

Broadcasting 
 TMS (entertainment data), data provider
 Test Match Special, BBC cricket coverage
 This Movie Sucks!, a Canadian TV show on bad movies
 That Metal Show, a US TV talk show

Organizations 
 The Minerals, Metals & Materials Society, a professional organization
 Texas Memory Systems, a manufacturer of solid-state drives
 TMS Entertainment; formerly Tokyo Movie Shinsha Co., Ltd.;  a Japanese animation studio
 Toronto Montessori Schools, Richmond Hill, Ontario, Canada
 Toyota Motor Sales, U.S.A., Inc.
 Trinity Mathematical Society, UK
 TMS (production team), an English songwriting and record team
 The Micropalaeontological Society

Schools 
 Tech Music School, London, UK
 Temasek Secondary School, Bedok, Singapore
 The Master's Seminary, Sun Valley, California, US
 Tyrrell Middle School, Wolcott, Connecticut, US

People 
 T. M. Soundararajan (1922–2013), an Indian singer

Places 
 São Tomé International Airport, IATA code

Science and medicine

Chemistry 
 Tetramethylsilane, an  organosilicon chemical compound
 Trimethylsilanol, an organosilicon chemical compound
 Trimethylsilyl, a functional group in chemistry
 Tricaine methanesulfonate or tricaine mesylate, an anesthetic for fish

Medicine and psychology 
 Tension myositis syndrome, a medical condition causing pain
 Total motile spermatozoa, in semen analysis
 Transcranial magnetic stimulation in neuroscience
 Tandem mass spectrometry, to analyse biomolecules

Sports 
 Texas Motor Speedway, Fort Worth, Texas, US
 TMS Ringsted, a Danish handball club

Technology 
 SAP Transport management system, managing software updates
 Tape management system for computer backups
 Tile Map Service, a standard for downloading maps
 Translation management system, software
 Transportation management system
 Traffic management system
 Training Management System

Other uses 
 Truth maintenance system, a knowledge representation method
 Hobby of Model Railroading or Tetsudō Mokei Shumi, Japanese magazine
 Tuen Mun South station, Hong Kong; MTR station code